Flipside is an Australian television comedy series produced by the  ABC in 2002. The seven episode, 30 minute sketch comedy series was written and performed by actors and comedians.  It was directed by Nicholas Bufalo with Producer Madeline Getson, Executive Producer Andrew Friedman and Script Editor Michael Ward. It has also screened on Foxtel's The Comedy Channel.

Cast
 Gerard Cogley
 Andrew Curry 
 Bernard Curry
 Stephen Curry
 Fiona Harris
 Nathaniel Kiwi
 Katrina Mathers
 Steven Stagg

See also
List of Australian television series
List of Australian Broadcasting Corporation programs

References

External links

2002 Australian television series debuts
Australian Broadcasting Corporation original programming
Australian comedy television series